There are at least 9 named mountains in Roosevelt County, Montana.
 Bears Nest, el. 
 Castle Rock, el. 
 Chris Hill, el. 
 Clay Butte, el. 
 Snake Butte, el. 
 Square Butte, el. 
 Sugar Top Hill, el. 
 Twomile Hill, el. 
 Windy Butte, el.

See also
 List of mountains in Montana
 List of mountain ranges in Montana

Notes

Landforms of Roosevelt County, Montana
Roosevelt